Mabton is a city in Yakima County, Washington, United States.  The population was 1,959 at the 2020 census.  Incorporated during the first few years of the 20th century, it is located at the eastern edge of the Yakama Indian Reservation.

History
The Mabton area's original inhabitants were the Yakama people, who were forced onto a reservation in 1855. Mabton's existence as a town is due to the Northern Pacific Railway, which arrived in the area around 1884 and built a water tower and section house on the site. Nothing else existed at Mabton until 1892 when Sam P. Flower built a store and a warehouse. He soon became the town's first postmaster. Mabton was named by Charlie Sandburg, a Swedish railworker, who proposed the name "Mabletown" for the wife (or daughter) of a railroad official who had spoken kind words to track workers during an inspection. By 1895, Mabton had several stores, a hotel, a railroad depot and a schoolhouse. The Mabton Townsite Company, formed by Sam P. Flower and J.A. Humphrey, made the first plat in 1902, and by 1904, it had more than a dozen businesses and a newspaper. The town of Mabton officially incorporated on November 7, 1905.

Today, residents primarily are employed in occupations related to agriculture, especially hop growing and grape growing.

The Mabton School District has been the repeated beneficiary of grants from the Bill and Melinda Gates Foundation:
 $558,000 over five years (from 2000 to 2005) to enhance student access to technology;
 In 2001, Mabton High School was one of sixteen high schools chosen to participate in the Washington State Achievers Program; the school gets a share proportional to its student population (about 330 students) of more than $9 million to support school improvement and redesign efforts and more than $100 million for college scholarships for its students;
 Over $40,000 over five years (2001–2006) to improve high school education and access to higher education; and
 Over $125,000 over 34 months (2001–2004) to support professional development programs in partnership with Heritage College.

A small ranch near Mabton was home to the first confirmed case of mad cow disease in the United States on December 23, 2003, later confirmed to be a cow of Canadian origin imported to the U.S.

Geography
Mabton is located at 46°12'42" North, 119°59'47" West (46.211618, -119.996520).

Demographics

2010 census
As of the census of 2010, there were 2,286 people, 528 households, and 478 families living in the city. The racial makeup of the city was 46.9% White, 0.7% African American, 0.2% Native American, 0.2% Asian, 48.4% from other races, and 3.6% from two or more races. Hispanic or Latino of any race were 91.9% of the population.

There were 528 households, of which 69.1% had children under the age of 18 living with them, 55.9% were married couples living together, 25.0% had a female householder with no husband present, 9.7% had a male householder with no wife present, and 9.5% were non-families. 7.0% of all households were made up of individuals, and 3.6% had someone living alone who was 65 years of age or older. The average household size was 4.31 and the average family size was 4.41.

The median age in the city was 23.6 years. 39.4% of residents were under the age of 18; 12.5% were between the ages of 18 and 24; 25.9% were from 25 to 44; 16.5% were from 45 to 64; and 5.8% were 65 years of age or older. The gender makeup of the city was 49.0% male and 51.0% female.

2000 census
As of the census of 2000, there were 1,891 people, 445 households, and 381 families living in the city.  The population density was 1,553.4/km2 (4,026.3/mi2).  There were 463 housing units at an average density of 380.4 inhabitants/km2 (985.8 inhabitants/mi2).  The racial makeup of the city was 21.73% White, 0.11% African American, 0.48% Native American, 1.00% Asian, 0.00% Pacific Islander, 73.88% from other races, and 2.80% from two or more races.  89.00% of the population were Hispanic or Latino of any race.

There were 445 households, out of which 60.0% had children under the age of 18 living with them, 59.3% were married couples living together, 17.3% had a woman whose husband does not live with her, and 14.2% were non-families. 12.4% of all households were made up of individuals, and 5.8% had someone living alone who was 65 years of age or older.  The average household size was 4.22 and the average family size was 4.54.

In the city, the population was spread out, with 41.9% under the age of 18, 12.9% from 18 to 24, 25.8% from 25 to 44, 12.9% from 45 to 64, and 6.5% who were 65 years of age or older.  The median age was 22 years.  For every 100 females, there were 104.0 males.  For every 100 females age 18 and over, there were 104.1 males.

The median income for a household in the city was $26,650, and the median income for a family was $26,198. Males had a median income of $18,917 versus $21,667 for females. The per capita income for the city was $7,694.  32.7% of the population and 27.9% of families were below the poverty line.  Out of the total people living in poverty, 44.0% were under the age of 18 and 18.2% were 65 or older.

Education
The city's library is open six afternoons and three evenings per week. In a space of about  it has over 5,000 volumes of hardback books, over 2000 paperbacks, and 26 magazine subscriptions. Many of its books and magazines are in Spanish.

Notable people
 Mel Stottlemyre, a pitcher and later a pitching coach for the New York Yankees. He won 164 games for them as a pitcher from 1964 to 1974, with three 20-win seasons. His son, Mel Stottlemyre Jr., is currently the pitching coach for the Miami Marlins.

References

External links
 City of Mabton
 Mabton School District

Cities in Washington (state)
Cities in Yakima County, Washington
Populated places established in 1892
Populated places on the Yakima River
1892 establishments in Washington (state)